Javiera is the Spanish spelling of the more rare feminine given name Xaviera. Both names derive from the Catholic saint  Francis de Xavier, where Xavier refers to the saint's birthplace.

People
Javiera Caballero (b. 1978), American politician
Javiera Carrera (1781–1862), Chilean aristocrat
Javiera Parra (b. 1968), Chilean musician and singer
Javiera Contador (b. 1974), Chilean actress, comedian and television host
Javiera Muñoz (1977–2018), Swedish singer with Chilean-Spanish roots
Javiera Salcedo (b. 1977), Argentine Olympic swimmer
Javiera Díaz de Valdés (b. 1981), Chilean television actress
Javiera Mena (b. 1983), Chilean musician

See also
 Xaviera
 Javiera y Los Imposibles, Chilean band led by Javiera Parra
 Liceo Javiera Carrera, Chilean high school

References

Spanish feminine given names